Crane Union High School is a public high school in Crane, Oregon, United States. It is a boarding school that serves students from a large geographic area.

Its district is known as the Harney County Union High School District 1J, and covers much of Harney County.

In 1976 it was the only American public boarding high school operated by a local school district.

History
It opened in 1918. It moved to Crane circa 1920 after initially being in Lawen.

On January 25, 1967, a fire ruined the school building.

Service area
The official school district attendance area includes, in addition to Crane: Diamond, Double-O Ranch, Drewsey, Fields, Frenchglen, Riley, and Suntex.

The school also historically served sections of Malheur County, and portions of Humboldt County, Nevada. Some communities in Nevada had inter-state agreements. Sending school districts pay the costs of tuition.

Crane Union historically served the Denio area, including when the townsite was in Oregon. The area on the Oregon state line across from Denio is, as of 2020, in the official Crane Union boundary.  Denio, Nevada parents with high school aged children may send their children to Crane Union instead of sending them to Albert M. Lowry High School in Winnemucca, Nevada.

Background
Crane Union High School is the only school in Crane Union High School District, which covered the most area in Oregon as of 2006, serving . Crane is one of the oldest public boarding schools in the country.

Admissions
The district automatically enrolls from the Harney County Union High School District 1J boundary in Harney County. The district also takes tuition-paying students from outside the boundary and students which are sent there by cooperative agreement from other school districts paying tuition.

Campus
It has  of area.

Male students have the first floor and female students have the second. The school started boarding in 1928, and established a brick dormitory, which had two floors, in 1931. In the 1940s a dormitory for female students opened. Its current facility, made of cement and steel, opened due to a 1967 fire that ruined the previous building.

The district also provides housing to employees.

Student body
In 1950 it had 63 students, with some of them Basque Oregoners from Denio, Oregon. In 1976 it had 99 students. In February 1998 it had 77 students, and in November of the same year it was up to 88, with 65 of them boarding. In 2002 the school had 97 students. In 2020 its student count was 96, with boarders making up 60 of them.

Eric Cain of Oregon Public Broadcasting stated that the student body is "some of the most rural kids in the state – maybe the country". Many of the students are alumni of one room schoolhouses and had regularly helped their families with ranch work prior to leaving for high school.

Academics
In 2008, 100 percent of the school's seniors received a high school diploma. Of 24 students, 24 graduated and none dropped out.

Transportation
 the district has no school bus for students. Students may drive themselves to/from school on weekends. This is because, as of 1972, the school officials use the funding from the state, used by other districts for transportation purposes, to fund the dormitory.

In 1950 the district had a bus to take students to Burns, Oregon so they could access entertainment.

Athletics
In 1998 about 90% of the students participated in athletics.

Feeder patterns
The high school, in its official attendance zone, takes students from the following K-8 school districts:
 Diamond School District 7
 Double O School District 28
 Drewsey School District 13
 Frenchglen School District 16
 Harney County School District 4 (Crane Elementary School)
 Pine Creek School District 5
 South Harney County School District 33 (Fields School)
 Suntex School District 10

 Denio School of the Humboldt County School District would also be a feeder school as Denio, Nevada students had Crane Union as one option for high school.

See also
 List of high schools in Oregon
 List of boarding schools in the United States

References

External links
 Crane Union High School
 

High schools in Harney County, Oregon
Education in Malheur County, Oregon
Education in Humboldt County, Nevada
Boarding schools in Oregon
Educational institutions established in 1918
Public high schools in Oregon
1918 establishments in Oregon
Public boarding schools in the United States